Lee Shearer (born 23 October 1977) is an English former professional footballer. His most notable former clubs include FF Jaro of the Veikkausliiga (Premier Finnish Division) and SBV Excelsior of the Dutch Eredivisie. He represented England at schoolboys level.

Shearer, former professional footballer,began his career as a trainee with Leyton Orient. He made his debut in October 1996, but was loaned to Dover Athletic in March 1997. He rejoined Dover on loan in November 1997, remaining with them until the end of the season. He was released by Orient and signed for Dover in July 1998. After four years as a regular in the Dover team, Shearer joined Margate in June 2002, having turned down a new contract with Dover. He played 24 times in the Conference before joining Gravesend & Northfleet in July 2003. He was loaned to Dover in October 2004 and released by Gravesend in December 2004. He was expected to join King's Lynn, but joined Dutch side RKSV Leonidas. In July 2005 joined Welling United, moving to Folkestone Invicta in February 2006. and then to Maidstone United in September 2006.

He later played for Dutch side Excelsior Rotterdam and Finnish side FF Jaro before rejoining Maidstone United, from where he joined Faversham Town in June 2008.

On 29 June 2011, Ashford United brought defender Lee Shearer on board ahead of a pre-season friendly against Gillingham and he subsequently played a handful of league matches for them.

References

External links
Lee Shearer Margate Football Club History

1977 births
Living people
Sportspeople from Southend-on-Sea
English footballers
Association football defenders
Leyton Orient F.C. players
Dover Athletic F.C. players
Margate F.C. players
Ebbsfleet United F.C. players
Welling United F.C. players
Folkestone Invicta F.C. players
Maidstone United F.C. players
Excelsior Rotterdam players
FF Jaro players
Faversham Town F.C. players
Ashford United F.C. players
English Football League players
National League (English football) players
Isthmian League players
Eredivisie players
Veikkausliiga players
RKSV Leonidas players